Vaporizer or vaporiser may refer to:

Anesthetic vaporizer, a device used in the administration of anesthesia
Electronic cigarette, or a part of one (often called a "PV" or "personal vaporizer")
Humidifier, a household appliance that increases humidity
Vaporizer (inhalation device), a device used to extract for inhalation the active ingredients of chemicals or plant materials
Vaporizer (internal combustion engine), a device to enable an engine to run on tractor vaporizing oil
Metal vapor synthesis, a technique that involves vaporizing metals

See also
Atomization (disambiguation)
Carburetor
Nebulizer
Ultrasonic nozzle